The Italian Permanent Representative to the North Atlantic Council is the Permanent Representative of the Italian government to the North Atlantic Council.

<onlyinclude>

References

NATO
 
Italian Permanent Representatives
Italy and NATO
Italy